Bandar Deylam (also Romanized as Bandar-e Deylam and Bandar Dīlam; also known as Bandar-e Delam; also known simply as Deylam or Dīlam) is a port city in the Central District of Deylam County, Bushehr province, Iran, and serves as capital of the county. At the 2006 census, its population was 19,829 in 4,426 households. The following census in 2011 counted 22,393 people in 5,603 households. The latest census in 2016 showed a population of 25,730 people in 7,359 households.

On 16 February 2005 a large explosion was reported close to the site of a newly built nuclear power plant.  Iranian officials later announced that the explosion was caused by construction work on a dam at Kowsar, near Deylam.

Climate

References 

Cities in Bushehr Province
Populated places in Deylam County